ICW may refer to:

International Whaling Commission
Integrated constructed wetland
International Clan War
International Community of Women Living with HIV/AIDS
International Confederation of Wizards
International Council of Women
Internet call waiting, a technology that allows a telephone line to accept incoming calls while connected to a dialup connection
Intracoastal Waterway
Indonesia Corruption Watch

Wrestling
International Championship Wrestling, a now-defunct professional wrestling promotion based in Lexington, Kentucky, active 1978-1984
International World Class Championship Wrestling, a now-defunct New England-based wrestling promotion, known as International Championship Wrestling from 1985 to 1991
Italian Championship Wrestling, an active Italian promotion established in 2001, began internet broadcasting shows in 2013
Insane Championship Wrestling, an active Scottish promotion established in 2006
Independent Championship Wrestling, an active American promotion established in 2008, based in Miami, Florida